The estuarine sea snake (Hydrophis vorisi), also known commonly as Kharin's sea snake, is a species of marine venomous snake in the family Elapidae. The species is native to waters around the northern tip of Australia in the Torres Strait.

Etymology
The specific name, vorisi, is in honor of American herpetologist Harold Knight Voris (born 1940).

Habitat
The preferred natural habitat of H. vorisi is the neritic zone.

Reproduction
H. vorisi is viviparous.

References

Further reading
Cogger HG (2014). Reptiles and Amphibians of Australia, Seventh Edition. Clayton, Victoria, Australia: CSIRO Publishing. xxx + 1,033 pp. .
Kharin V (1984). "[Sea snakes of the genus Hydrophis sensu lato (Serpentes, Hydrophiidae), on taxonomic status of New Guinea H. obscurus ]". Zoologicheskii Zhurnal 63 (4): 630–632. (Hydrophis vorisi, new species). (in Russian).
Wilson, Steve; Swan, Gerry (2013). A Complete Guide to Reptiles of Australia, Fourth Edition. Sydney: New Holland Publishers. 522 pp. .

Hydrophis
Reptiles described in 1935
Snakes of Australia